Ronald L. "Fang" Mitchell (born February 8, 1948) is an American college basketball coach and the former head men's basketball coach at Coppin State University.

Early life, education, and business career
Born in Philadelphia and raised in Camden, New Jersey, Mitchell graduated from Woodrow Wilson High School in Camden. Because he could not afford college, Mitchell worked factory and service jobs before attending Gloucester County College. Mitchell played on the Gloucester basketball team while also working the night shift as a computer operator at a bank.

Mitchell then attended Rutgers University–Camden for a year, before embarking on a business career. He worked as a shoe company manager and printing sales representative. In Glassboro, New Jersey, Mitchell founded a clothing store, Mr. Fang's Athletic Attire, which expanded from one to three locations.

Coaching career

Gloucester County College
With no coaching experience, Mitchell became head coach at Gloucester County College in 1978. In his first season, he led the previously struggling Gloucester County Roadrunners to a stunning 19–11 record, then to consecutive seasons with 26 or more wins per year until the 1985–86 season. Gloucester County also made the NJCAA tournament in 1980, 1981, 1985, and 1986.

While Gloucester County head coach, Mitchell also assisted at Temple University basketball camps and became a good friend of Temple coach John Chaney. Additionally, Mitchell completed his Bachelor of Business Administration degree at Thomas Edison State College in 1984.

Coppin State
In 1986, Coppin State University, a member of the Mid-Eastern Athletic Conference (MEAC), hired Mitchell to be head coach for the Coppin State Eagles men's basketball team; Mitchell would hold this position for 28 seasons. Mitchell earned his master's degree in adult and continuing education at Coppin State in 1994 while head coach. In his 28 seasons as head coach, Mitchell was named MEAC Coach of the Year six times. He also led Coppin State to first place in the MEAC regular season standings ten times and four NCAA tournament appearances.

The Coppin State Eagles improved annually from 8–19 in Mitchell's first season to 26–7 in the 1989–90 season and a berth in the 1990 NCAA tournament. The season also included an upset over Maryland. After being projected to finish seventh in the conference in coaches' and sports information directors' preseason polls, Coppin State finished the season 22–8 and first in the MEAC and also made the 1993 NCAA tournament. In 1995, Mitchell turned down an offer to be head coach at FIU with a salary of $150,000, 90 percent higher than his current pay at Coppin State.

Coppin State next made the NCAA Tournament in 1997 as a #15 seed and upset #2 South Carolina in the first round before losing to Texas in the second round 82–81. Coppin State's last NCAA Tournament berth under Mitchell was in 2008.

On March 28, 2014, Coppin State opted not to renew Mitchell's contract, following three consecutive losing seasons and nine losing seasons in the last ten.

Personal life
Mitchell married the former Yvonne Forston in 1990; they remained married until her death in 2002.

Head coaching record

Junior college

College

References

1948 births
Living people
African-American basketball coaches
American men's basketball players
Basketball coaches from New Jersey
Basketball coaches from Pennsylvania
Basketball players from Camden, New Jersey
Basketball players from Philadelphia
College men's basketball head coaches in the United States
Coppin State Eagles men's basketball coaches
Coppin State University alumni
Junior college men's basketball coaches in the United States
Junior college men's basketball players in the United States
Rutgers University–Camden alumni
Sportspeople from Camden, New Jersey
Thomas Edison State University alumni
Woodrow Wilson High School (New Jersey) alumni
21st-century African-American people
20th-century African-American sportspeople